The Grant Van Valkenburg House (also known as the Anderson House) is a historic home in West Palm Beach, Florida, United States. It is located at 213 Rosemary Avenue.  It was added to the National Register of Historic Places in 1999.

It was deemed significant as "a fine example of a Craftsman bungalow with Victorian detailing. The one and a half story, wood frame dwelling sits on a raised concrete foundation and has a gabled roof with multi-planes and two gabled dormers, all with wide, overhanging eaves. The house is clad in three wood variations and has many decorative exterior features, including Victorian scroll-sawn woodwork. The interior of the Van Valkenburg House features many elements characteristic of Craftsman-style bungalows, including built-in furniture, leaded glass cabinet doors, wide baseboards, picture rails, coved ceilings, round arch openings, and carved woodwork. The house remains largely intact since its construction in 1918 and retains a high degree of architectural integrity. The house is architecturally significant as one of the last remaining Craftsman bungalows with Victorian detailing within the City of West Palm Beach."

The house was moved from 316 Hibiscus Street to its current location in 1996.

References

External links

 Palm Beach Hibiscus, official website of B&B the house is now

Houses on the National Register of Historic Places in Florida
National Register of Historic Places in Palm Beach County, Florida
Houses in Palm Beach County, Florida
Bed and breakfasts in Florida